Bodé is a settlement in Senegal. At the last census (2002), the village had 339 inhabitants and 47 households.

External links
PEPAM

References 

Populated places in the Bignona Department
Arrondissement of Tendouck